Geylang West Single Member Constituency was an electoral constituency in Singapore. It used to exist from 1959 to 1988 where it was absorbed into Jalan Besar GRC.

Member of Parliament

Elections

Elections in the 1950s

Elections in the 1960s

Elections in the 1970s

References 

Singaporean electoral divisions
Kallang
Geylang